Comix Zone is a 1995 beat 'em up video game developed and published by Sega for the Genesis. It is set within the panels of a comic book with dialogue rendered within talk bubbles and sprites, and backgrounds possessing the bright colors and dynamic drawing style of superhero comics. This style is in previous video games, for example Ocean Software's Batman: The Caped Crusader in 1988, but Comix Zone stretched the idea to such an extent that Sega applied for and was granted a patent for a "videogame system for creating a simulated comic book game".

The concept for the game originated from a 1992 demo video for the Amiga titled "Joe Pencil Trapped In The Comix Zone", animated by Peter Morawiec. It explores how the gameplay and the comic book elements would blend in.

Plot

Sketch Turner, a "starving artist" and freelance rock musician living in New York City, is working on his newest comic book, Comix Zone. It is the story of the New World Empire's attempt to defend Earth from an invasion of alien renegades, with inspiration coming from Sketch's oddly vivid dreams and nightmares. One night, while Sketch is working on Comix Zone during a thunderstorm, a lightning bolt strikes a panel of his comic. In this instant, its main villain, a powerful mutant named Mortus, escapes the comic book's pages, desiring to kill Sketch so he can become flesh and blood and take over the real world. Because he does not possess any power in reality, Mortus sends Sketch into the world of his own comic, freely drawing in enemies attempting to kill him.

Inside the comic book, Sketch meets General Alissa Cyan, who believes he is "the chosen one" who came to save their post-apocalyptic world from the evil of Mortus and the alien invaders. Ignoring Sketch's protests, Alissa sends him on his mission, keeping in touch with instructions and hints via radio. It is up to Sketch to stop Mortus's evil plans and find a way out of this comic world.

The game has two possible endings. At the end of the game, Alissa attempts to defuse a nuclear weapon that Mortus and the Mutants plan on using to wipe out the New World Empire and humanity, when Mortus comes back into the comic and throws her into the chamber, which starts to fill up with liquid. Mortus then battles Sketch personally. If the player defeats Mortus and the Kreeps he summons as he takes damage quickly enough to drain the liquid and save Alissa before the nuke self-destructs, an ending occurs where Alissa comes to the real world with Sketch and Roadkill and joins the army, eventually becoming Chief of Security for the United States. Roadkill is given a vast amount of mozzarella cheese, and spends a lot of time exploring the city's new sewer system when not sleeping under a pile of Sketch's dirty socks. Comix Zone becomes an instant sensation, selling out on the first day, making Sketch famous as it becomes the best-selling comic book ever.

Defeating Mortus after the chamber fills with liquid, Alissa dies as the nuke self-destructs. Sketch and Roadkill come out, but Sketch's comic is destroyed, leaving him devastated at having saved the New World Empire, but failed to save Alissa. The ending also implies that he re-creates his comic to ensure a happy ending.

Gameplay
Comix Zone is an action platformer in which players control Sketch as he progresses through panels of his comic book, hoping to reach the end and escape before his own creations finish him off. Each level consists of two pages and secrets are discovered by shredding the paper and revealing items. Along with standard attacks such as punching, kicking and jump attacks, Sketch can store up to three items in his inventory to help him overcome obstacles. Along with weapons such as bombs and knives which can also be used to destroy obstacles, Sketch can pick up iced tea to restore his health, and a fist that transforms Sketch into Super Sketch, dealing a powerful attack on all on-screen enemies. His pet rat Roadkill can discover hidden items and access areas that are too dangerous for Sketch to reach.

Sketch can also tear off the backdrop into a paper plane to throw at enemies, but this costs health and can also hurt Sketch if he's not careful. In order to progress through the pages, Sketch often has to either successfully solve a puzzle, or defeat all the enemies within that panel. Arrows will then appear, allowing Sketch to jump to another panel, with some areas offering multiple routes.

Sketch's health is determined by a health bar, which is diminished when Sketch is damaged by enemies or obstacles. It will also diminish as Sketch punches through breakable objects or if he uses his paper plane move. If Sketch loses all his life, or falls down a bottomless pit, the game will end and Mortus will take his place in the real world.

However, the player can gain extra chances by clearing the first and second chapters, which allow Sketch to resume from the beginning of the page should he die. Comix Zone is designed to be used with the 6-button gamepad: buttons X, Y and Z correspond to the three inventory slots Sketch has. If used with a 3-button gamepad, button C cycles through the items, and button A activates the item. Button C on a 6-button gamepad is used for a custom action, blocking by default; on a 3-button gamepad, Sketch blocks automatically.

Development

Conception
Comix Zone was conceived by the Sega Technical Institute (STI) programmer Peter Morawiec. Many of Morawiec's fellow STI developers were comic book fans and made monthly trips to local comic shops. He devised the Comix Zone concept after joining his co-workers on one of their trips to a shop in Palo Alto, California. Morawiec "felt that comics and games could be very complementary" and began working on a technology demonstration for his Amiga. The story was inspired by the 1985 music video for "Take On Me" by A-ha, which depicts a race car driver in a comic book connecting with a woman in the real world. Morawiec added a dystopian setting based on his passion for science fiction films.

Morawiec presented the video, "Joe Pencil Trapped in the Comix Zone", to STI head Roger Hector in December 1992. Hector was enthralled by the concept, saying: "The minute I saw it, I knew it was going to be great." He encouraged Morawiec to pitch it directly to Sega of America CEO Tom Kalinske, who approved it. Although Kalinske wanted development to begin immediately, Comix Zone was placed on hold so STI could work on Sonic Spinball (1993), as Sega wanted to have a Sonic the Hedgehog game available for the 1993 Christmas shopping season. Following Spinball release, STI pitched several concepts, including Comix Zone, to Sega management. Kalinske remembered Comix Zone and asked STI to begin development.

Morawiec approached programmer Adrian Stephens, who had joined STI as a programmer as Spinball was nearing completion, about working on Comix Zone. Development began with a three-man team of Morawiec, Stephens, and executive producer Dean Lester. According to Hector, "It took a few months to put together a team capable of delivering the game". The team grew as large as a dozen people and was given high priority at STI and the full support of the studio. Additional staff included Jonah Hex co-creator Tony DeZuniga, comic book artist Alex Niño, lead animator Bob Steele, artist Chris Senn, programmer Stieg Hedlund, and associate producer Mike Wallis. Hector, who served as the manager, credited Morawiec as the project lead.

Production
The initial protagonist was Joe Pencil, a "geeky-looking" character who Morawiec based on "the classic comic book angle of a scrawny kid getting transformed into a powerful superhero." Sega's marketing department objected to the character's name and design, so he was renamed Sketch Turner and Morawiec, a fan of the Smashing Pumpkins, redesigned him to resemble a grunge rocker. The marketing department also demanded, against Morawiec's wishes, that Sketch have a sidekick, a popular trend in games at the time. Morawiec did not want Sketch to be followed by a human or a large animal, so he conceived Roadkill since a rat "didn't take up a lot of screen space, and we could do quite a bit with it in terms of puzzles and such." The marketing department felt that a pet rat was an awkward choice, but Lester and the other developers supported it.

STI sought to design Comix Zone faithfully to its comic book theme, including in its animation style. DeZuniga designed the beginning and ending sequences; he drew the art with ink and pencils before scanning it into a computer and processing it for the Genesis. Senn contributed character animations as well as some background art and bosses. As development progressed, Stephens found it challenging to program the game so it would fit within two megabytes while being able to decompress large pages of graphics during play. He noted that the Genesis was not designed with this process in mind, but was pleased that he managed to make it happen. When STI sent Comix Zone to Sega of Japan for review, it received a note claiming the game "embodied everything that was wrong with American culture". Hedlund said the team took this as "high praise".

Comix Zone became STI's top project with the full support of Sega's marketing department. The development was relatively smooth, though the game was repeatedly delayed so the team could add more features, leading to a release late in the Genesis' lifecycle. Comix Zone was one of the only two games, the other being The Ooze, to bear the STI logo. It was the first game that Wallis worked on during his time at Sega, and the last Genesis game Senn worked on. The soundtrack was composed by Howard Drossin, who used the GEMS sound driver and chose a rock music style. Drossin sought to demonstrate the sound capabilities of the Genesis and that it could produce more than just chiptune. He provided most of the male audio clips, while various administrative assistants provided female audio clips. Morawiec contributed the voice of the villain Gravis.

Late in development, Sega's testing department recommended that the difficulty level be increased. Average players found it difficult to complete the game as a result, and Morawiec expressed regret that he followed the test department's recommendation. As development concluded, pressure was mounting as the American STI team had not released a game since Spinball. Further complicating matters was the forthcoming release of Sega's new consoles, the 32X and Sega Saturn, and Stephens expecting a child. Resultingly, Comix Zone scope was reduced for a sooner-than-planned release and two levels had to be removed. In retrospect, Morawiec felt the development would have greatly benefited from the contributions of STI's more experienced Japanese staff, who had split from the main team following the release of Sonic the Hedgehog 2 (1992).

Release
Comix Zone was released for the Genesis in North America on August 2, 1995, in Japan on September 1, 1995, and in Europe on October 27, 1995. The game received a small print run in Japan and became an expensive collector's item in the years following its release. A port for Windows was released in North America in November 1995 and in Europe in March 1996. The port, released when Microsoft was promoting Windows 95 as a legitimate game platform, is largely identical to the Genesis version, though it features a MIDI rendition of the soundtrack. Sales of Comix Zone were hampered by its late release in the Genesis' lifecycle, after the worldwide launch of next-generation hardware like the Saturn and Sony's PlayStation. According to Stephens, Hector said that Comix Zone failed to break even, which Morawiec attributed to the popularity of the PlayStation.

To promote Comix Zone as "edgy and cool", Sega bundled Comix Zone with a CD featuring rock songs by popular bands such as Love and Rockets, Danzig, and the Jesus and Mary Chain. STI originally planned for the bundled CD to contain several Comix Zone tracks performed by a grunge band that Drossin had formed in Los Angeles, but Sega chose a different approach. Morawiec said that the team, particularly Drossin, was upset by the change, though their planned CD was still manufactured and distributed via a magazine, European and Windows copies, and Sega's short-lived Sega Tunes label. Hardcore Gaming 101 described the rock CD as "a stunt that further drives the nineties-ness of [Comix Zone] as a time capsule for an era when game companies often released a lot of crazy promotional crap to sell their products".

Reception 

GamePro considered the game's visuals a successful recreation of the look and feel of a comic book, but said that the game quickly sours once the player encounters the repetitive combat and overly simplistic puzzles. They also found problems with the controls: "Sketch can't move rapidly around the panel, and button slamming yields unpredictable results." They concluded, "You really want to love Comix Zone for its original elements, but after a few panels, the honeymoon's over." The four reviewers of Electronic Gaming Monthly acknowledged the problems with the controls, but also remarked that the graphics are exceptionally colorful for a Genesis game, and argued that the originality of its comic book look makes it a must-have despite its flaws.

Next Generation reviewed the Genesis version of the game and stated that while the unique concept, outstanding visuals, and solid soundtrack make the game of interest, the gameplay is derivative and repetitive. They summed up, "A very cool idea for a game that wasn't executed properly, Comix Zone is better than most." In 2017, GamesRadar ranked Comic Zone 43rd on their "Best Sega Genesis/Mega Drive games of all time." They lauded the animation and sound effects as "magnificent" and beyond the supposed limitation of the console.

Ports and related releases

The game was ported to Windows 3.1 in 1995 by Sega PC. It was the first game to use the WinG graphics library.
The game was ported to the Game Boy Advance only in Europe on September 11, 2002, which was developed by Virtucraft and published by Sega. Its significantly smaller screen size that allows much less on-screen was said to reduce the effect of seeing into the other frames around the player, making it more like a traditional platform game.

The game is hidden within the Japanese version of Sonic Mega Collection and can be unlocked in all versions of Sonic Mega Collection Plus by having a Sonic Heroes game save, or by starting all other Genesis games at least 50 times. The game is part of the Sega Genesis Collection for the PlayStation 2 and PlayStation Portable (also called Sega Mega Drive Collection in PAL regions) On January 29, 2007, Comix Zone was released for the Wii's Virtual Console, and Xbox Live Arcade on June 10, 2009. The game appears in Sonic's Ultimate Genesis Collection (for Xbox 360 and PlayStation 3) and on June 3, 2010, it was released on Steam. It is also included in the Genesis pack. In August 2011, the game was made available for download on PlayStation Network as part of the Sega Vintage Collection, with trophy support.

On June 22, 2017, the game was published on iOS and Android mobile operating systems as part of the Sega Forever retro game collection.

The game is in the Genesis Mini retro console which was released on September 19, 2019.

On September 22, 2020, a vinyl record soundtrack of the game's music was announced by record label Cartridge Thunder. The record release features the original Sega Genesis soundtrack by Howard Drossin, as well as live recordings from the band Roadkill.

On June 30, 2022, the game was released on the Nintendo Switch Online + Expansion Pack.

Film adaptation
In August 2022, Sega announced that they partnered with Picturestart, to develop a film adaptation of the game.

References

Citations

Works cited

External links 

Comix Zone demo for Windows 95 and Windows 3.1 hosted at Sega of America's official website
Comix Zone can be played for free in the browser on the Internet Archive

1995 video games
Game Boy Advance games
Nintendo Switch Online games
Sega beat 'em ups
Sega Genesis games
Sega Technical Institute games
Virtual Console games
Xbox 360 Live Arcade games
PlayStation Network games
Video games developed in the United States
Single-player video games
Video games with alternate endings
Video games scored by Howard Drossin
Video games set in New York City
Works about comics